Villa Amalia is a 2009 French drama film adapted from the novel Villa Amalia by Pascal Quignard. It is directed by Benoît Jacquot and stars Isabelle Huppert.

Plot
Ann (Isabelle Huppert) is a gifted and brilliant musician whose sense of security falls to pieces when she witnesses her husband kissing another woman. Without hesitation, she abandons him and takes a headlong rush into the arms of a new beginning, embarking on a transnational journey that ultimately takes her to an isolated villa on the secluded island of Ischia, Italy. Once settled, Ann insists on goading herself to fresh extremes, and takes it upon herself to swim out as far into the ocean as possible. Fainting under the scorching summer rays, her floating body is pulled out of the water by local woman Giulia (Maya Sansa), with whom Ann begins to explore a whole new facet of life.

Cast
 Isabelle Huppert as Ann
 Jean-Hugues Anglade as Georges
 Xavier Beauvois as Thomas
 Maya Sansa as Giula
 Clara Bindi as Marion
 Viviana Aliberti as Veri
 Michelle Marquais as La mère d'Ann
 Peter Arens as Ann's father
 Ignazio Oliva as Carlo
 Jean-Pierre Gos as The real-estate
 Jean-Michel Portal as Piano buyer

References

External links

2009 films
2009 drama films
2000s French-language films
Films directed by Benoît Jacquot
French drama films
Films based on French novels
Films scored by Bruno Coulais
2000s French films